Michael de la Roche (born 19 October 1954) is a Canadian sailor. He competed in the Tornado event at the 1976 Summer Olympics.

References

External links
 

1954 births
Living people
Canadian male sailors (sport)
Olympic sailors of Canada
Sailors at the 1976 Summer Olympics – Tornado
Sportspeople from Quebec City